Francis Herbert Bradley  (30 January 1846 – 18 September 1924) was a British idealist philosopher. His most important work was Appearance and Reality (1893).

Life
Bradley was born at Clapham, Surrey, England (now part of the Greater London area). He was the child of Charles Bradley, an evangelical Anglican preacher, and Emma Linton, Charles's second wife. A. C. Bradley was his brother. Educated at Cheltenham College and Marlborough College, he read, as a teenager, some of Immanuel Kant's Critique of Pure Reason. In 1865, he entered University College, Oxford. In 1870, he was elected to a fellowship at Oxford's Merton College where he remained until his death in 1924. Bradley is buried in Holywell Cemetery in Oxford.

During his life, Bradley was a respected philosopher and was granted honorary degrees many times. He was the first British philosopher to be awarded the Order of Merit. His fellowship at Merton College did not carry any teaching assignments and thus he was free to continue to write. He was famous for his non-pluralistic approach to philosophy. His outlook saw a monistic unity, transcending divisions between logic, metaphysics and ethics. Consistently, his own view combined monism with absolute idealism. Although Bradley did not think of himself as a Hegelian philosopher, his own unique brand of philosophy was inspired by, and contained elements of, Georg Wilhelm Friedrich Hegel's dialectical method.

Philosophy
Bradley rejected the utilitarian and empiricist trends in British philosophy represented by John Locke, David Hume, and John Stuart Mill. Instead, Bradley was a leading member of the philosophical movement known as British idealism, which was strongly influenced by Kant and the German idealists, Johann Fichte, Friedrich Schelling, and Hegel, although Bradley tended to downplay his influences.

In 1909, Bradley published an essay entitled "On Truth and Coherence" in the journal Mind (reprinted in Essays on Truth and Reality). The essay criticises a form of infallibilist foundationalism in epistemology. The philosopher Robert Stern has argued that in this paper Bradley defends coherence not as an account of justification but as a criterion or test for truth.

Moral philosophy
Bradley's view of morality was driven by his criticism of the idea of self used in the current utilitarian theories of ethics. He addressed the central question of "Why should I be moral?"

He opposed individualism, instead defending the view of self and morality as essentially social. Bradley held that our moral duty was founded on the need to cultivate our ideal "good self" in opposition to our "bad self". However, he acknowledged that society could not be the source of our moral life, of our quest to realise our ideal self. For example, some societies may need moral reform from within, and this reform is based on standards which must come from elsewhere than the standards of that society.

He made the best of this admission in suggesting that the ideal self can be realised through following religion.

His views of the social self in his moral theorising are relevant to the views of Fichte, George Herbert Mead, and pragmatism. They are also compatible with modern views such as those of Richard Rorty and anti-individualism approaches.

Legacy
Bradley's philosophical reputation declined greatly after his death. British idealism was practically eliminated by G. E. Moore and Bertrand Russell in the early 1900s. Bradley was also famously criticised in A. J. Ayer's logical positivist work Language, Truth and Logic for making statements that do not meet the requirements of positivist verification principle; e.g., statements such as "The Absolute enters into, but is itself incapable of, evolution and progress."
There has in recent years, however, been a resurgence of interest in Bradley's and other idealist philosophers' work in the Anglo-American academic community.

In 1914, a then-unknown T. S. Eliot wrote his dissertation for a PhD from the Department of Philosophy at Harvard University on Bradley. It was entitled Knowledge and Experience in the Philosophy of F. H. Bradley. Due to tensions leading up to and starting the First World War, Eliot was unable to return to Harvard for his oral defence, resulting in the university never conferring the degree. Nevertheless, Bradley remained an influence on Eliot's poetry.

Books and publications
 The Presuppositions of Critical History (1874), Chicago: Quadrangle Books, 1968. (1874 edition)
 Ethical Studies, (1876), Oxford: Clarendon Press, 1927, 1988. (1876 edition)
 The Principles of Logic (1883), London: Oxford University Press, 1922. (Volume 1)/(Volume 2)
 Appearance and Reality (1893), London: S. Sonnenschein; New York: Macmillan. (1916 edition)
 Essays on Truth and Reality, Oxford: Clarendon Press, 1914.
 Collected Essays, vols. 1–2, Oxford: Clarendon Press, 1935.

See also
Bradley's regress

References

External links

 
 Encyclopædia Britannica
 Selected essays from Ethical Studies
 Online text of Appearance and Reality
 Francis Herbert Bradley, An Unpublished Note on Christian Morality on AnthonyFlood.com
 Summaries of F.H. Bradley's ethical arguments
 Selected Recordings of F.H. Bradley's Writings

1846 births
1924 deaths
19th-century British non-fiction writers
19th-century British philosophers
19th-century essayists
20th-century British non-fiction writers
20th-century British philosophers
20th-century essayists
Alumni of University College, Oxford
British ethicists
British logicians
British male essayists
Epistemologists
Fellows of Merton College, Oxford
Idealists
Ontologists
People from Clapham
Philosophers of culture
Philosophers of education
Philosophers of history
Philosophers of language
Philosophers of logic
Philosophers of mind
Philosophers of religion
Philosophy academics
Philosophy writers
Social philosophers
Honorary Fellows of the British Academy